Erik Donald Swanson (born September 4, 1993) is an American professional baseball pitcher for the Toronto Blue Jays of Major League Baseball (MLB). He made his MLB debut in 2019 with the Seattle Mariners.

Amateur career
Swanson attended Mariemont High School in Cincinnati, Ohio, where he played in the same league as Andrew Benintendi of Madeira High School. He later played college baseball at Wabash Valley College and Iowa Western Community College.

Professional career

Texas Rangers
The Texas Rangers selected Swanson in the eighth round of the 2014 Major League Baseball draft. Swanson made his professional debut in 2014 with the Spokane Indians and he spent the whole season there, pitching to a 1–2 win-loss record with a 4.63 earned run average (ERA) in  innings pitched out of the bullpen. He pitched 2015 with the Arizona League Rangers, Hickory Crawdads, Frisco RoughRiders and Round Rock Express, compiling a combined 1–0 record and 2.35 ERA in  innings, and started 2016 with Hickory.

New York Yankees
On August 1, 2016, Swanson was traded with Dillon Tate and Nick Green to the New York Yankees for Carlos Beltrán. He finished that season with the Charleston RiverDogs. In 24 games (17 starts) between the two clubs, he was 6–5 with a 3.46 ERA. He spent 2017 with the Tampa Yankees where he was 7–3 with a 3.95 ERA in 20 starts and started 2018 with the Trenton Thunder. He rehabbed with the Staten Island Yankees during the year and was also promoted to the Scranton/Wilkes-Barre RailRiders in May. In 24 games (22 starts) with the three clubs, he went 8–2 with a 2.66 ERA and a 1.00 WHIP.

Seattle Mariners
On November 19, 2018, the Yankees traded Swanson, Justus Sheffield, and Dom Thompson-Williams to the Seattle Mariners for James Paxton. The Mariners added him to their 40-man roster the next day. 

Swanson opened the 2019 season with the Tacoma Rainiers, with whom he was 0–1 with a 5.55 ERA. He was recalled to the major leagues for the first time on April 9, 2019. He made his major league debut on April 11, 2019. In 2019 he was 1–5 with a 5.74 ERA.

In 2020 he was 0–2 with a 12.91 ERA. In 2021 he came back with a 3.31 ERA and 35 strikeouts in  innings.

During the 2022 season, Swanson took another step forward, as he recorded a 1.68 ERA with 70 strikeouts across  innings.

Toronto Blue Jays
On November 16, 2022, the Mariners traded Swanson and pitching prospect Adam Macko to the Toronto Blue Jays for outfielder Teoscar Hernández.

Personal life
Swanson and his wife, Madison, married in 2018 and reside in Fargo. They have one son and one daughter together.

References

External links

Living people
1993 births
People from Fargo, North Dakota
Baseball players from North Dakota
Major League Baseball pitchers
Seattle Mariners players
Wabash Valley Warriors baseball players
Iowa Western Reivers baseball players
Arizona League Rangers players
Spokane Indians players
Hickory Crawdads players
Frisco RoughRiders players
Round Rock Express players
Staten Island Yankees players
Charleston RiverDogs players
Tampa Yankees players
Trenton Thunder players
Scranton/Wilkes-Barre RailRiders players
Tacoma Rainiers players
Everett AquaSox players